Tender Dracula, or Confessions of a Blood Drinker is a 1974 French horror-comedy film directed by Pierre Grunstein. The film stars Peter Cushing, Alida Valli, Bernard Ménez and Miou-Miou. The film involves two scriptwriters and two girls who are ordered by their director to visit the castle home of a horror actor (Peter Cushing) and to talk him out of his intention to change from horror films to romantic ones. The longer they stay in the castle, the more likely it seems that the actor is an actual vampire.

Cast
Peter Cushing - MacGregor
Alida Valli - Heloise
Bernard Menez - Alfred
Miou-Miou - Marie
Nathalie Courval - Madeline
Stephane Shandor - Boris
Julien Guiomar - Producer

Production
The film was shot between February 11, 1974, and March 29, 1974.

Release
The film was released in France in 1974. The film was released in France with the alternative title La Grande Trouille. It was released in the United States with the titles Tender Dracula, or Confessions of a Blood Drinker and The Big Scare. It was released in the United States in January 1975.

Notes

References

External links
 

1974 horror films
1970s French-language films
French comedy horror films
Dracula films
1974 films
Vampire comedy films
1970s comedy horror films
1974 comedy films
Films set in castles
1970s French films